The Theaterfestival Spielart is an international theatre festival which takes place every two years during November and December in Munich, starting in 1995. The festival lasts between 15 and 17 days. Guests usually include over 20 international theater and performance groups.

History 
The Spielart Theater Festival has existed since 1995 and is a continuation of the traditional theater festival from Thomas Petz in Munich (1979-1985). Spielart mainly consists of independent theater groups that maintain an experimental approach to the theater art form. The program of 1995 stated that Spielart wants to promote new unconventional theater, which override all geographical and thematic restrictions.

The festival has been led by Tilmann Broszat since 1995. He designs the program together with Gottfried Hattinger.

Structure 

Program 
Spielart has been bringing guest performances from renown international artists to Munich since 1995. The guests include:

 Forced Entertainment (Tim Etchells)
 Dumb Type
 Helena Waldmann
 Needcompany (Jan Lauwers)
 Socìetas Raffaello Sanzio (Romeo Castellucci)
 Teatr Cinema
 Nico and the Navigators
 Marie Brassard
 Jérôme Bel
 Stefan Kaegi (Rimini Protokoll)
 Christoph Marthaler
 Rick Miller
 Plasma
 Alvis Hermanis
 Heiner Goebbels
 Jan Fabre
 Lola Arias

Venues 
Spielart does not have its own venue. The guests performances are shown at various locations in Munich. The festival cooperates regularly with the Muffatwerk, the Gasteig, the Munich Kammerspiele, as well as the I-camp / Neues Theater München and the Pathos Transport Theater. Close connections exist with the Institute for Theatre Studies at the Ludwig Maximilian University of Munich, and the Bayerische Theaterakademie August Everding.

References

External links 
 Spielart
 Spielmotor

Theatre festivals in Germany
Theatres in Munich